The College of Marine Arts was operated as the Sea Research Society's formal higher education wing from 1972 until 1978. It was initially located in Columbia, South Carolina and later moved to Mount Pleasant, outside of Charleston where it was housed in the former Berkeley County courthouse building on Pitt Street.

Students participated in classroom workshops on history and artifact identification & conservation as well as in underwater archaeological projects on the wrecks of the Civil War blockade runners Georgiana, Mary Bowers and Constance as well as paleontological projects in the Cooper River and refuse sites in the Ashley River.

Degrees 

The College of Marine Arts awarded five doctorates in Marine Histories (DMH or MHD). They were issued for a combination of research and jure dignitatis. Recipients included Pablo Bush Romero of CEDAM, E. Lee Spence, Peter Throckmorton, Robert F. Marx, and Anders Franzén, each published historians, known for their important shipwreck discoveries and their pioneering work in underwater archaeology.

References 

Underwater archaeology
Private universities and colleges in South Carolina